Kilton is a village in the borough of Redcar and Cleveland and the ceremonial county of North Yorkshire, England. It is part of the civil parish of Lockwood.

History
The village is recorded in the Domesday Book as Chiltune, which is possibly derived from a combination of Old Norse and Old English of "narrow-valley farm/settlement' or a Scandinavianised form of cilda-tun, 'children's farm/settlement." The village is to the west of Kilton Beck Valley, a narrow cut that carries the Kilton Beck to the sea at Skinningrove.

In the 13th century, Kilton Castle was the base of the rebel Will Wither.

References

Villages in North Yorkshire
Places in the Tees Valley
Redcar and Cleveland